The tutorial system is a method of university education where the main teaching method is regular, very small group sessions. These are the core teaching sessions of a degree, and are supplemented by lectures, practicals and larger group classes. This system is found at the collegiate universities of Oxford and Cambridge, although other universities use this method to various degrees.

Oxbridge
The tutorial system was established in the 1800s at the University of Oxford and the University of Cambridge in the United Kingdom. It is still practised today, and consists of undergraduate students being taught by college fellows (or sometimes doctoral students and post-docs) in groups of one to three on a weekly basis. These sessions are called "tutorials" at Oxford and "supervisions" at Cambridge, and are the central method of teaching at those universities. The student is required to undertake preparatory work for each tutorial: for example, reading, essays or working through problems, depending on their subject. Other teaching sessions such as lectures, practicals and language classes are offered, but these are in addition to the compulsory tutorials.

At Oxbridge, tutorials/supervisions are the central element of the teaching, as opposed to lectures, seminars or larger group teaching. During each tutorial session, students are expected to orally communicate, defend, analyse, and critique the ideas of others as well as their own in conversations with the tutor and fellow students. It has been argued that the tutorial system has great value as a pedagogic model because it creates learning and assessment opportunities which are highly authentic and difficult to fake.

Outside Oxbridge
Other universities practise this system as well, though on a less intensive basis and one that is less central to the overall structure of the course. The University of Buckingham, England's first private university founded in the 1970s, also practises the weekly tutorial system although in larger groups of six students.

Outside the United Kingdom, other universities have a tutorial system influenced by the Oxbridge system. Some examples are Omega Graduate School in Tennessee, Williams College in Massachusetts, Honors Tutorial College of Ohio University, Sarah Lawrence College in New York, New College of Florida, and the Bachelor of Arts with a major in Liberal Studies at Capilano University in North Vancouver, Canada. In France, the system of Classe préparatoire aux grandes écoles has a similar system of weekly oral examinations, called khôlles,  by groups of two or three. In the Netherlands, the educational approach of Maastricht University is based on student-led Tutorials in a Problem-Based-Learning setting.

Some universities use the name tutorial for teaching sessions or pastoral support meetings. These are additional parts of a students education, rather than its core feature.

References

Further reading
 Adamson, J. W. [Briefest of references to the Oxford Tutorial in] "Education." In From Steel and Addison to Pope and Swift. Vol. 9 of The Cambridge History of English Literature, ed. A. W. Ward and A. R. Waller, 459. New York: G. P. Putnam's Sons, 1913. This extremely short excerpt can be read through Google Books.
 Bailey, Cyril. "The Tutorial System." Revised by J. B. Bamborough. In Handbook to the University of Oxford, 279–286(?). Oxford: Clarendon Press, 1965.
 Beck, Robert J. "The Pedagogy of the Oxford Tutorial." Paper presented at the Tutorial Education: History, Pedagogy, and Evolution conference, Lawrence University, Appleton, WI, 31 March – 1 April 2007. See .
 Brewer, Derek. "The Tutor: A Portrait." In C. S. Lewis at the Breakfast Table and Other Reminiscences, new ed., ed. James T. Como, 41–67. San Diego: Harcourt Brace, Harvest, 1992. You can actually read the whole of this section through Amazon.com's "Search inside this book" feature.
 Highet, Gilbert. "Communication: Tutoring." In The Art of Teaching, 107–116. New York: Knopf, 1950.
 Kiosses, Spyridon. "Teaching and Studying Ancient Greek Literature: A First Approach to a Case Study." Master's thesis, University of Oxford, 1997.
 Mayr-Harting, Henry. "Oxford Tutorials." Paper presented at the Tutorial Education: History, Pedagogy, and Evolution conference, Lawrence University, Appleton, WI, 31 March – 1 April 2007. See . 
 Moore, Will G. The Tutorial System and Its Future. New York: Pergamon, 1968.
 Oxford University Education Committee. Policy Guidance on Undergraduate Learning and Teaching, University of Oxford, 2008. See .
 Palfreyman, David, ed. The Oxford Tutorial: "Thanks, You Taught Me How to Think,"  2nd ed. Oxford: Oxford Centre for Higher Education Policy Studies, 2001. See . 
 Paper 6: Tutorial Teaching. Oxford: Institute for the Advancement of University Learning, n.d. See .
 Ryan, Alan. "The Oxford Tutorial: History and Myth." Keynote address at the Tutorial Education: History, Pedagogy, and Evolution conference, Lawrence University, Appleton, WI, 31 March – 1 April 2007. See .
 Shale, S. Understanding the Learning Process: Tutorial Teaching in the Context of Research into Learning in Higher Education. Oxford: Institute for the Advancement of University of Learning, 2000.
 "Subject Specific Remarks." Corpus Christi College, University of Cambridge, 2008,  (9 October 2009).
 Trigwell, Keith and Ashwin, Paul. Undergraduate Students' Experience of Learning at the University of Oxford, Institute for the Advancement of University Learning, University of Oxford, 2003. See .
 "Tutorials." In Academic Handbook and Code of Practice for Tutorial Fellows, Other Teaching Fellows, College Lectures, [and] Graduate Teaching Assistants. Oxford: Oriel College, 2008, 5–6. See . 
 Waterland, Daniel. "Advice to a Young Student, with a Method of Study for the First Four Years." In The Works of the Rev. Daniel Waterland, 3rd ed., vol. 4, 393–416. Oxford: Oxford University Press, 1856. Of Waterland's Advice. . . it is said that it "is an outstanding monument to the theory and practice of tutorial instruction in early eighteenth-century Cambridge," from Victor Morgan, 1546–1750, vol. 2 of A History of the University of Cambridge (Cambridge: Cambridge University Press, 2004), 342.
 Williams, Gavin. "Socrates in Stellenbosch and Tutorials in Oxford." Paper presented at the Tutorial Education: History, Pedagogy, and Evolution conference, Lawrence University, Appleton, WI, 31 March – 1 April 2007. See .

Teaching
Pedagogy
Oxbridge
Terminology of the University of Oxford
Terminology of the University of Cambridge